The Journal of Cognitive Neuroscience is a monthly peer-reviewed academic journal covering cognitive neuroscience. It aims for a cross-discipline approach, covering research in neuroscience, neuropsychology, cognitive psychology, neurobiology, linguistics, computer science, and philosophy. The journal is published by the MIT Press and the Cognitive Neuroscience Institute and the editor-in-chief is Bradley R. Postle (University of Wisconsin–Madison).

Abstracting and indexing
The journal is abstracted and indexed in:

According to the Journal Citation Reports, the journal has a 2020 impact factor of 3.225.

References

External links

Neuroscience journals
MIT Press academic journals
Quarterly journals
English-language journals
Publications established in 1989
Cognitive science journals